Eitan Haber (12 March 1940 – 7 October 2020) was an Israeli journalist and publicist, known for his writing on military and security issues, and for his longtime association with the late Israeli Prime Minister Yitzhak Rabin.

Biography
Eitan Haber was born in Tel Aviv. He came from a Revisionist Zionist family. When he was eleven, he secretly joined the Betar youth movement but when his father found out, he was furious. At that point, he joined the religious Tzofim.

Journalism and media career
In 1958 he was drafted into the Israel Defense Forces and was posted as a reporter for the Bamahane military newspaper. During his service he met and befriended the commander of the Northern Command, Yitzhak Rabin.

On his discharge from the IDF in 1960, he joined Yedioth Ahronoth as a correspondent on military issues. He was also an investigator for several Israeli television programs and edited and presented radio programs on Israel Army Radio.

In late 1985 he was appointed by Rabin, then Minister of Defense, to be his special media adviser. After Rabin's withdrawal from the government in 1990, he returned to Yedioth Ahronoth. When Rabin was elected Prime Minister in 1992, he was appointed to be an adviser and bureau chief. He wrote many of Rabin's speeches, was part of the team that secretly negotiated the Israel–Jordan Treaty of Peace, and organized Rabin's official travels abroad, including to the Oslo Accords and Rabin's reception of the Nobel Prize for Peace.

On the night of 4 November 1995, he delivered the official government statement regarding Rabin's death:

The government of Israel announces in dismay, in great sadness, and in deep sorrow, the death of prime minister and minister of defence Yitzhak Rabin, who was murdered by an assassin, tonight in Tel Aviv. May his memory be blessed.

After Rabin's death, he returned to his journalistic career.
He wrote several books and coauthored others  with Michael Bar-Zohar, Ze'ev Schiff, Yossi Melman and Ehud Ya'ari.

Business career
He was the President and CEO of Geopol Ltd. since 1996. Since 2001, he served as CEO of Kavim Ltd., and was a member of the board of directors of Africa Israel Ltd. and "Israel Experience Co." Since 2002, he was a director of Ampal Ltd. He was also a board member of the Jewish Agency for Israel.

Death
In September 2019, Haber was diagnosed with colon cancer, which forced him to retire from Yedioth Ahronoth. He died on 7 October 2020 in Ramat Gan at the age of 80 following complications from the disease. He was also suffering from Parkinson’s disease.

Published works
 
 
 
 
Michael Bar-Zohar and Eitan Haber (1983) Massacre in Munich Lyons Press,

See also
Journalism in Israel

References

External links
 
 
 Obituary

1940 births
2020 deaths
People from Tel Aviv
Jews in Mandatory Palestine
Israeli journalists
Israeli civil servants
Israeli businesspeople
Israeli non-fiction writers
People with Parkinson's disease
Deaths from cancer in Israel
Deaths from colorectal cancer